Eito Prem is a 2015 Bangladeshi romance feature film written by Shohel Arman and also directed by Shohel Arman. The film stars Shakib Khan and Bindu as the lead pair of the film along with the Ramendu Majumdar, Shahiduzzaman Selim, Afroza Banu, Amit Hasan and Syed Hasan Imam. The film's score and soundtrack were composed by Habib Wahid.

Plot
Eito Prem is a love story set during the 1971 Liberation War of Bangladesh.

Cast
 Shakib Khan as Surjo
 Bindu as Madhabi
 Shahiduzzaman Selim
 Ramendu Majumdar
 Afroza Banu
 Syed Hasan Imam
 Amit Hasan
 Nipun
 Masum Aziz
 Siraj Haider
 Pran Ray
 Sayed Babu

Soundtrack

The film score of the film as well as the soundtrack was scored by Habib Wahid. The soundtrack, featuring 7 tracks overall, has lyrics by Shohel Arman.

The soundtrack was released in 2009. The album was both critically acclaimed and gained popularity upon its release.

Track listing

References

2015 films
2015 romantic drama films
Bengali-language Bangladeshi films
2015 war drama films
Bangladeshi romantic drama films
Bangladeshi war drama films
War romance films
Films based on the Bangladesh Liberation War
Films set in 1971
Pakistan Navy in fiction
Films scored by Habib Wahid
2010s Bengali-language films